Stuart Klawans has been the film critic for The Nation since 1988. He also writes a column on the visual arts for The New York Daily News.

Education
He obtained his degree from Yale University.

Awards and honors
He won the 2007 National Magazine Award for Reviews and Criticism and he received a 2003 Guggenheim Fellowship to work on a critical study of Preston Sturges. His 1998 book Film Follies: The Cinema Out of Order was a finalist in the Criticism category for the National Book Critics Circle Award.

Appearances
Klawans appears in the 2009 documentary For the Love of Movies: The Story of American Film Criticism describing the importance and impact of two deceased film critics, Manny Farber and Vincent Canby. His work has appeared in The New York Times.

Books
Film Follies: The Cinema Out of Order
Left in the Dark: Film Reviews and Essays, 1988-2001

Family
Klawans is the son of the late Yoletta Klawans, a first grade teacher,  and the late Jack Klawans, a manager of a chain of women's clothing stores. Klawans is married to Bali Miller, a private advisor in modern and contemporary art in New York. He lives in New York City.

References

External links
Stuart Klawans on The Daily Beast
Stuart Klawans on New York Film Critics Choice

American film critics
Living people
The Nation (U.S. magazine) people
Yale University alumni
Year of birth missing (living people)